Scultetus or Sculteti is the Latinized form of German family names Schultheiß, Schulze, Schulte, etc. 

Notable people of the surname include:
Abraham Scultetus (1566–1625), German professor of theology
Bartholomäus Scultetus (1540–1614), mayor of Görlitz
Hans Robert Scultetus, German meteorologist and SS officer
Johannes Scultetus (1595–1645), German surgeon

See also
Scultetus Binder- a bandage with many tails applied in an overlapping fashion to the trunk or another portion of the body to hold a dressing in place without having to tie or tape the bandage in place. Named for the German surgeon, Johannes Scultetus.
Praetorius